Patricia Draper (born 2 April 1959) is a former Liberal Party politician. She held the seat of Makin seat from 1996 to 2007.

Early life
Draper was born in Woodville, South Australia, the daughter of German migrants who travelled to Australia after WWII. During her early teens she was a member of the Girl Guides and the RSPCA. Her early ambition was to become a High School Teacher, to teach Economics and History. However, influenced by her mother's chosen career of Nursing, at the age of 19, Trish became a nurse.

She joined the Navy and completed her training as a Medic specialising in Surgical and Theatre Nursing. After leaving the Navy, she moved into the area of Aged Care Nursing, while completing her Bachelor of Arts Degree at the University of South Australia. In 1993 and 1994 Trish was elected as a Student Representative for the Salisbury Campus and Coordinator of the Save Salisbury Campus Campaign.

Parliamentary career
Draper joined the Liberal Party in 1992 and subsequently stood for pre-selection for the Makin in November 1994. Draper went on to win the seat of Makin at the 1996 Federal Election.

Draper went on to win the former Labor seat of Makin in the next three elections (1998, 2001 and 2004). In 1998 she held her seat despite holding a 1% margin before the election.

In 2000, Draper campaigned against continuing high petrol prices, calling on the Federal Government to freeze the proposed GST component of petrol excise indexation. The Prime Minister and Cabinet subsequently changed the policy to permanently abolish the GST component of petrol excise indexation.

In 2003, together with her colleague the Member for Canning Don Randall MP, Trish Draper introduced a Private Members Bill, Protection of Australian Flags (Desecration of the Flag) Bill 2003 A Bill for an Act to amend the Flags Act 1953. However the bill lapsed, and did not become law.

Draper was involved in a travel controversy when she took her boyfriend away with her to a taxpayer-funded study tour to England, Ireland, France and the Netherlands in 2004. She was forced to pay back nearly $10,000 of his expenses. Whilst Draper maintained she had done nothing wrong, the ensuing controversy lead to a review of MP travel entitlements.

In September 2007, Draper was awarded the William Wilberforce Parliamentary Award.

Committee Service

House of Representatives Standing Committees
Aboriginal and Torres Strait Islander Affairs 8.12.98 to 31.8.04. Family and Community Services 20.3.02 to 31.8.04. Library 20.3.02 to 31.8.04. Privileges 1.12.04 to 07. Procedures 1.12.04 to 07. Chairman of Publications 1.12.04 to 07.

Joint Standing Committee
Foreign Affairs, Defence and Trade 1.12.04 to 07.

Coalition Policy Committees
Education, Science and Training 1996 to 2007. Health and Ageing 1996 to 2007. Small Business and Tourism 1998 to 2007. Secretary Health and Ageing  1998 to 2001. Chairman Health and Ageing 2001 to 2004.

Retirement from Federal Parliament
In June 2006, after the death of a long serving staff member, and the sudden illness of her husband, Draper decided to retire from Federal politics. Although Prime Minister John Howard encouraged her to stay, Draper announced her intention to retire at the 2007 election. The seat fell to Labor then-record two-party vote of 57.7 percent from a then-record two-party swing of 8.6 percent. The seat became the safest of the 23 Labor won from the coalition at the election.

In the lead up to 2010 South Australian state election, Draper stood for pre-selection for the state seat of Newland. She failed to win the seat at the subsequent election.

Currently, Draper continues to be a member of the Liberal Party, supporting the volunteers in the Newland and Makin branches, and working and mentoring in the community.

References

1959 births
Living people
Politicians from Adelaide
Liberal Party of Australia members of the Parliament of Australia
Members of the Australian House of Representatives
Members of the Australian House of Representatives for Makin
University of South Australia alumni
Women members of the Australian House of Representatives
21st-century Australian politicians
21st-century Australian women politicians
20th-century Australian politicians
20th-century Australian women politicians